Janice Argyle is an English karateka. She is the winner of multiple European Karate Championships and World Karate Championships Karate medals.

References

Black British sportswomen
English female karateka
Living people
Year of birth missing (living people)
World Games gold medalists
Competitors at the 1985 World Games
World Games medalists in karate